Emmelina aethes is a moth of the family Pterophoridae. It is found in Mexico.

The wingspan is about 19 mm. The antennae are pale cinereous (ash-grey), barred with dark brown above. The head and thorax are pale fawn-brownish. The forewings are pale fawn-brown, mixed with pale cinereous and some dark fuscous scaling. The hindwings and cilia are greyish brown. Adults are on wing in September.

References

Moths described in 1915
Oidaematophorini